Jason Roger Anderson (born June 9, 1979) is an American former professional baseball pitcher and current college baseball coach. He is currently serving as head coach of the Eastern Illinois Panthers baseball team.

Career
In 1997, Anderson was all-state during his senior year at Danville High School. He compiled a 14–1 record and tied the Illinois state record for consecutive shutouts with six in a row.

Anderson attended the University of Illinois on a baseball scholarship for two years, earning All-American and Academic All-American honors.

Anderson was drafted by the New York Yankees in the 2000 Major League Baseball Draft and signed by scout Steve Lemke. In the  season, he became the first player from the Staten Island Yankees to become a New York Yankee. (Wily Mo Peña was the first Staten Island alum to make it to the majors, but he did it with the Cincinnati Reds.) The "Baby Bombers" retired Anderson's #19 on July 14, 2003, in tribute. That day was also proclaimed "Jason Anderson Day" in Staten Island. Anderson earned his first major league win that year in 22 appearances with the Yankees, but midway through the year, he was traded to the New York Mets in a deal that brought Armando Benítez to the Yankees.

In the  season, Anderson was designated for assignment by the Mets, and the Cleveland Indians claimed him off waivers. He only pitched one inning for the team all year, giving up five runs, and in the next year, he rejoined the Yankees, making the major league roster after Paul Quantrill and Mike Stanton were designated for assignment.

The San Diego Padres claimed Anderson off waivers from the Yankees on February 15, . Anderson was signed November 16, 2006, by the Chicago Cubs to a minor league contract.

Anderson landed in the Phillies organization May 9, when he was signed to a minor league contract and sent to the Ottawa Lynx; however, he did not get called up in 2007 and on December 7, 2007, was re-signed by the Phillies to a minor league contract. He split the 2007 season between the Triple-A Ottawa Lynx and the Double-A Reading Phillies. He split  between the Triple-A Lehigh Valley IronPigs and Double-A Reading Phillies. He became a free agent after the 2008 season and re-signed with the Phillies in January .

On March 7, 2011, he signed a contract with the Somerset Patriots. He retired on July 19.

In fall 2012, he was named the pitching coach of Eastern Illinois, an NCAA Division I college baseball program.  After serving in this role for three seasons, he was promoted to head coach.

Head coaching record

References

External links

Minor League Baseball: Stats: Player: Jason Anderson

1979 births
Living people
American expatriate baseball players in Canada
Baseball coaches from Illinois
Baseball players from Chicago
Buffalo Bisons (minor league) players
Cleveland Indians players
Columbus Clippers players
Eastern Illinois Panthers baseball coaches
Greensboro Bats players
Illinois Fighting Illini baseball players
Lehigh Valley IronPigs players
Major League Baseball pitchers
New York Mets players
New York Yankees players
Norwich Navigators players
Ottawa Lynx players
People from Danville, Illinois
Portland Beavers players
Reading Phillies players
Somerset Patriots players
Staten Island Yankees players
Tampa Yankees players